The Frederick-Ames EOS/SFA was a single-seat sports aircraft designed in the United States in the 1970s with the intention of marketing it for homebuilding. It was a highly streamlined low-wing cantilever monoplane with swept flying surfaces and retractable tricycle undercarriage. Its construction was of metal throughout.

Originally named simply the Eos (for the Greek goddess of the dawn), it was shown at the 1973 EAA Fly-in at Oshkosh, Wisconsin, albeit in incomplete form. When finished, it crashed on its first flight due to an engine seizure, was extensively damaged, and abandoned as too expensive to repair. Nevertheless, the aircraft was rebuilt in 1978 and re-engined with a Volkswagen engine conversion. Plans to market the design were never realised. Two other examples are known to exist.

Specifications

References

 
 
 
 

1970s United States sport aircraft
Homebuilt aircraft
Aircraft manufactured in the United States
Low-wing aircraft
Single-engined tractor aircraft
Aircraft first flown in 1973